George Warren may refer to:

(in date order)
 Sir George Warren (MP) (1735–1801), British Member of Parliament
 George Warren (missionary) (fl. 1811), British missionary in Sierra Leone
 George Warren (East India Company officer) (1801–1884), British Army general
 George Warren, 2nd Baron de Tabley (1811–1887), British nobleman and politician
 George Washington Warren (1813–1883), Massachusetts attorney, jurist, and politician
 George Warren (assemblyman) (born 1828), American politician in Wisconsin
 George Warren (prospector) (1835–1893), American copper prospector
 George T. Warren (c. 1842 – after 1916), U.S. politician in Michigan
 George Henry Warren (1823–1892), New York City lawyer
 George Henry Warren II (1855–1943), New York City stock broker and real estate developer
 George H. Warren (pilot boat) a 19th-century pilot boat 
 George Frederick Warren Jr. (1874–1938), agricultural economist and author, adviser to president Franklin D. Roosevelt
 George Warren (footballer) (1880–1917), English footballer
 George Warren (South Carolina politician) (1887–1961), a South Carolina attorney and politician
 George Warren (priest), Canadian Anglican priest
 George Earle Warren (died 1971), American investment banker